Esena Perimeno (Greek: Εσένα Περιμένω; English: I'm waiting for you) is the second studio album by Greek singer Despina Vandi. It was released in Greece in 1996 by Minos EMI and according to Despina Vandi it sold 18,000 copies.

Track listing

Music videos
"Efiges"
"Den Petheni I Agapi"
"Esena Perimeno"

Release history

Credits and personnel

Personnel
Panos Falaras - lyrics
Ntinos Georgountzos - keys
Natalia Germanou - lyrics
Antonis Gounaris - guitars, orchestration
Nikos Hatzopoulos - violin
Pantelis Kanarakis - lyrics
Thanasis Kargidis - music
Tony Kontaxakis - music, lyrics, background vocals, orchestration
Giorgos Kostoglou - electric bass
Antonis Koulouris - drums
Lambis Livieratos - lyrics
D. Manakidis - background vocals
Christoforos Mpalampanidis - music, lyrics
Giannis Mpithikotsis - bouzouki, tzoura, baglama
Christos Nikolopoulos - music
Giorgos Roilos - percussion
Ercan Saatci pm - music, lyrics
Stefanos Stefanopoulos - saxophone
Kiriakos Tsolakis - accordion
Despina Vandi - vocals, background vocals
Harry Varthakouris - music, lyrics, background vocals, orchestration

Production
Thodoris Hrisanthopoulos - transfer
Giannis Ioannidis - mastering
Achilleas Theofilou - production manager
Konstantinos Theofilou - sound engineer, mixing
Harry Varthakouris - production manager

Design
Kostas Avgoulis - styling
Manolis Kalampokis - photos
Polina Katsouli - make up
Spiros Lieros - hairdressing
Alkistis Spilioti - cover care

Credits adapted from the album's liner notes.

References

Despina Vandi albums
Greek-language albums
1996 albums
Minos EMI albums